The David Rumsey Historical Map Collection is a large private map collection with over 150,000 maps and cartographic items. The collection was created by David Rumsey who, after making his fortune in real estate, focused initially on collecting 18th- and 19th century maps of North and South America, as this era "saw the rise of modern cartography."

After 2004 Rumsey expanded the collection to include maps from the 16th though 21st centuries, covering more of the world. In 2008 the collections's website was cited as one of only seven websites with freely available "skillfully compiled carto-bibliographic entries with corresponding early-map images." At that time the site comprised 16,000 digital images.

In February 2009, David Rumsey announced that the entire collection would be donated to Stanford University, including 150,000 maps and their digital images, as well as the database used to track the images. Stanford houses the collection in the new David Rumsey Map Center which opened in the main library in 2016. The website (where the images are posted on-line) was to continue as a separate public resource.

As of February 2022, there were over 114,000 digitized items available through the website, hundreds of which were hosted through Google Earth layers. Select maps are also featured at the Rumsey Maps island in Second Life. as well as 2D and 3D GIS. A new MapRank search tool has been added enabling geographical searching of about 60,000 maps from the collection by map location and coverage. In addition, a Georeferencer tool has been added that allows site users to georeferenced and display any of the maps in the collection. The website has additional viewers from Luna Imaging, Inc, including the LUNA browser which doesn’t require any special plug-ins or software to view the collection, zoom into image detail, create slide shows, media groups, or presentations.

The website also has a blog listing new additions to the collection, featured maps, news, videos, and related sites.

When a document is found on the website, it is usually accompanied by extensive metadata, such as author, date of publication, short title, type, dimensions, note(s), area, full title of the document, full title of the publication it may be part of with notes and download options.

References

External links
 David Rumsey Map Collection: Cartography Associates

Map collections
Historical geographic information systems
Discipline-oriented digital libraries
American digital libraries
Map websites